William J. Linder was an American community development leader, and founder of New Community Corporation.
He was a 1991 MacArthur Fellow. He died on June 8, 2018.

Life
Linder was born in West New York, NJ and attended Saint Peter's Prep in Jersey City, NJ graduating in 1954. He then graduated from Seton Hall University with a BA, and from Fordham University with an MA and PhD.
The New Community Corporation was formed in response the 1967 Newark riots. 
Joseph Matara was chief operating officer, and was the designated successor.

References

External links
http://www.rayzo.com/events/e-clarion_0909/Editorial.pdf
http://www.nytimes.com/1996/02/18/nyregion/bill-linder-and-his-city-of-hope.html?pagewanted=all&src=pm

MacArthur Fellows
2018 deaths
Seton Hall University alumni
Fordham University alumni
Year of birth missing